PP-135 Sheikhupura-I is a Constituency of Provincial Assembly of Punjab.

General elections 2013

b

General elections 2008

See also
 PP-134 Nankana Sahib-IV
 PP-136 Sheikhupura-II

References

External links
 Election commission Pakistan's official website
 Awazoday.com check result
 Official Website of Government of Punjab

Constituencies of Punjab, Pakistan